Rapidgrass is an American bluegrass band founded in Golden, Colorado in 2012. Although they are widely considered a bluegrass band, their genre of music can best be described as "rapidgrass" due to its furious pace and its wide range of influences including gypsy jazz, bluegrass, swing and classical music. The lineup includes Mark Morris (guitar, vocals), Coleman Smith (violin, mandolin, vocals), Carl Meinecke (upright bass, tenor banjo, vocals), and Alex Johnstone (mandolin, fiddle, vocals), and Billy Cardine (dobro, vocals, recording producer).

The band released their first CD, Rapidgrass Quintet in 2013 and was voted as one of the top 5 albums by the Mountain Arts Culture Colorado. In the summer of
2015, the band were winners of the RockyGrass Band Competition, earning them a spot on the main stage of the 2016 festival. Previous winners of the Rockygrass Contest include Mark O'Connor, Tim O'Brien, Steep Canyon Rangers and The Railsplitters. Rapidgrass embarked on a world tour in 2016, most notably headlining the La Roche Bluegrass Festival in France.

Soon thereafter they released their second studio album, Crooked Road, produced by Tim Carbone of Railroad Earth. In June 2017, the band released its third studio album Happy Trails at the 8th annual Rapidgrass Music Festival in Idaho Springs, CO. In 2018, Rapidgrass was recognized as the "Best Bluegrass Band in Denver" by 303 Magazine. In 2020, Rapidgrass announced the release of their 5th album, Take Him River.

Discography

Albums

Music videos

References

External links 
Official website

American bluegrass music groups
Musical groups established in 2012
Golden, Colorado
2012 establishments in Colorado